Diporiphora albilabris, the white-lipped two-line dragon or tar tar lizard, is a species of agama found in Australia.

References

Diporiphora
Agamid lizards of Australia
Taxa named by Glen Milton Storr
Reptiles described in 1974